Bent Stumpe (born 12 September 1938, Copenhagen, Denmark) is a Danish electronic engineer who spent most of his career at the international research laboratory CERN, Geneva, Switzerland. Stumpe built in 1972, following an idea launched by Frank Beck, a capacitive touchscreen for controlling CERN's Super Proton Synchrotron accelerator. In 1973 Beck and Stumpe published a CERN report, outlining the concept for a prototype touchscreen as well as a multi-function computer-configurable knob.

Education
Bent Stumpe was educated within the Royal Danish Air Force and obtained a certificate as a radio/radar engineer in 1959.

Career
Leaving the Air Force, Stumpe was employed from 1959–1961 at the Danish radio and television factory TO-R Radio before he was employed by CERN from 1961 until 2003. In combination with his activities at CERN, Stumpe was a consultant to the World Health Organization working on the development of an instrument for the early detection of Leprosy.

References

20th-century Danish engineers
Engineers from Copenhagen
1938 births
People associated with CERN
Living people
Electronics engineers
20th-century Danish inventors